The following outline is provided as an overview of and topical guide to the U.S. state of Nevada:

Nevada – U.S. state in the intermountain west region of the United States. Nevada is mostly desert or semiarid. Over two-thirds of Nevada's people live in the Las Vegas metropolitan area, and about 86% of the state's land is owned by the US government, under various departments and agencies.

General reference 

 Names
 Common name: Nevada
 Pronunciation: 
 Official name: State of Nevada
 Abbreviations and name codes
 Postal symbol: NV
 ISO 3166-2 code: US-NV
 Internet second-level domain: .nv.us
 Nicknames
 Battle Born State (refers to the fact that Nevada joined the Union during the Civil War)
 Sagebrush State
 Silver State (formerly used on license plates)
 Adjectival: Nevada
 Demonyms
 Nevadan
 Nevadian

Geography of Nevada 

Geography of Nevada
 Nevada is: a U.S. state, a federal state of the United States of America
 Location
 Northern hemisphere
 Western hemisphere
 Americas
 North America
 Anglo America
 Northern America
 United States of America
 Contiguous United States
 Western United States
 Mountain West United States
 Southwestern United States
 Population of Nevada: 2,700,551 (2010 U.S. Census)
 Area of Nevada:
 Atlas of Nevada

Places in Nevada 

 Historic places in Nevada
 Ghost towns in Nevada
 National Historic Landmarks in Nevada
 National Register of Historic Places listings in Nevada
 Bridges on the National Register of Historic Places in Nevada
 National Natural Landmarks in Nevada
 National parks in Nevada
 State parks in Nevada

Environment of Nevada 

Environment of Nevada

 Climate of Nevada
 Superfund sites in Nevada
 Wildlife of Nevada
 Fauna of Nevada
 Birds of Nevada

Natural geographic features of Nevada 
 Mountain ranges of Nevada
 Rivers of Nevada
 Valleys of Nevada

Regions of Nevada 

 Southern Nevada
 Western Nevada

Administrative divisions of Nevada 

 The 16 counties and 1 independent city of the state of Nevada
 Municipalities in Nevada
 Cities in Nevada
 State capital of Nevada: Carson City
 Largest city in Nevada: Las Vegas (28th most populous city in the United States)
 City nicknames in Nevada

Demography of Nevada 

Demographics of Nevada

Government and politics of Nevada 

Politics of Nevada
 Form of government: U.S. state government
 United States congressional delegations from Nevada
 Nevada State Capitol
 Political party strength in Nevada

Branches of the government of Nevada 

Government of Nevada

Executive branch of the government of Nevada 
Governor of Nevada
Lieutenant Governor of Nevada
 Secretary of State of Nevada
 State Treasurer of Nevada
 State departments
 Nevada Department of Transportation
 State agencies
 Nevada Athletic Commission
 Nevada Gaming Commission
 Nevada Gaming Control Board

Legislative branch of the government of Nevada 

 Nevada Legislature (bicameral)
 Upper house: Nevada Senate
 Lower house: Nevada Assembly

Judicial branch of the government of Nevada 

Courts of Nevada
 Supreme Court of Nevada

Law and order in Nevada 

Law of Nevada
 Cannabis in Nevada
 Capital punishment in Nevada
 Individuals executed in Nevada
 Constitution of Nevada
 Crime in Nevada
 Gun laws in Nevada
 Law enforcement in Nevada
 Law enforcement agencies in Nevada
 Nevada Highway Patrol
 Same-sex marriage in Nevada
 Grazing rights in Nevada

Military in Nevada 

 Nevada Air National Guard
 Nevada Army National Guard

History of Nevada 

History of Nevada

History of Nevada, by period 
 Prehistory of Nevada
Indigenous peoples
Paiute
Wovoka
Ghost Dance
Washo
Spanish colony of Alta California, 1804–1821
Adams–Onis Treaty of 1819
Mexican War of Independence, September 16, 1810 – August 24, 1821
Treaty of Córdoba, August 24, 1821
Mexican territory of Alta California, 1821–1848
California Trail, 1841–1869
Mexican–American War, April 25, 1846 – February 2, 1848
Treaty of Guadalupe Hidalgo, February 2, 1848
Unorganized territory of the United States, 1848–1850
State of Deseret (extralegal), 1849–1850
Compromise of 1850
Territory of Utah east of California border from 37th parallel north to 42nd parallel north, (1850–1866)–1896
Comstock Lode, 1858–1878
Paiute War, 1860
Pony Express, 1860–1861
American Civil War, April 12, 1861 – May 13, 1865
Nevada in the American Civil War
First Transcontinental Telegraph completed 1861
Territory of New Mexico south of 37th parallel north, (1850–1863)–1912
Territory of Nevada between California border and 39th meridian west from Washington from 37th parallel north to 42nd parallel north, 1861–1864
Nevada in the American Civil War, 1861–1865
Territory of Arizona south of 37th parallel north, (1863–1867)–1912
State of Nevada becomes 36th State admitted to the United States of America on October 31, 1864
Utah annexation, 1866
Arizona annexation, 1867
First transcontinental railroad completed 1869
Hoover Dam completed 1936
Great Basin National Park established on October 27, 1986
Death Valley National Park designated on October 31, 1994

History of Nevada, by region 

 By city
 History of Boulder City
 History of Carson City
 History of Las Vegas
 History of Virginia City

History of Nevada, by subject 
 Territorial evolution of Nevada

Culture of Nevada 

Culture of Nevada
 Museums in Nevada
 Religion in Nevada
 The Church of Jesus Christ of Latter-day Saints in Nevada
 Episcopal Diocese of Nevada
 Scouting in Nevada
 State symbols of Nevada
 Flag of the State of Nevada 
 Great Seal of the State of Nevada

The Arts in Nevada 
 Music of Nevada

Sports in Nevada 

Sports in Nevada

Economy and infrastructure of Nevada 

Economy of Nevada
 Communications in Nevada
 Newspapers in Nevada
 Radio stations in Nevada
 Television stations in Nevada
 Energy in Nevada
 List of power stations in Nevada
 Solar power in Nevada
 Wind power in Nevada
 Health care in Nevada
 Hospitals in Nevada
 Mining in Nevada
 Gold mining in Nevada
 Silver mining in Nevada
 Transportation in Nevada
 Airports in Nevada

Education in Nevada 

Education in Nevada
 Schools in Nevada
 School districts in Nevada
 High schools in Nevada
 Colleges and universities in Nevada
 University of Nevada
 UNLV

See also

Topic overview:
Nevada

Index of Nevada-related articles

References

External links 

Nevada
Nevada